The Basilica of Our Lady of Nazareth of Exile (also the Basilica of Belém) is a minor basilica of the Catholic Church located in the city of Belém, Pará, Brazil. Its construction started in 1909 at the place where the image of the Virgin of Nazareth was found by Plácido José de Souza (whose origins are controversial, with different versions) in the state of Pará, on the banks of the Murututu Igarapé.

The current structure of the basilica was designed in 1909 by Gino Coppedè, and was commissioned by Barnabite priests of the Genoa house. Coppedè planned the structure as a basilica rather than a parish church. It followed the design of Basilica of Saint Paul Outside the Walls in Rome, an eclectic, Neoclassical, 19th-century structure by Pasquale Belli and Luigi Poletti. Coppedè's design, controversially, had no steeples. As with Church of Saint Anne, designed by the Italian architect Landi, dual bell towers were added despite the intent of the architect. The municipal government of Belém argued that all churches in the Lusophone world should have two steeples. The cornerstone was placed on October 24, 1909, by the then Archbishop of Belem, Santino Maria Coutinho.

Pope Pius XI declared the temple a basilica on 19 July 1923. Pope Pius XII granted a decree of pontifical coronation to its venerated Marian image on 9 July 1953 and was crowned on 15 August the same year. Pope Benedict XVI then elevated to the status of the Archdiocesan Marian Sanctuary on 31 May 2006, becoming the Basilica Sanctuary of the Virgin of Nazareth.

Protected status

The Basilica of Our Lady of Nazareth was listed as a historic structure by the Department of Historic, Artistic and Cultural Heritage (DPHAC) of the state of Pará in 1992.

See also
Roman Catholicism in Brazil
Our Lady of Nazareth

References

Basilica churches in Brazil
Roman Catholic churches in Pará
State heritage sites of Pará
Buildings and structures in Belém